Poul Liebst (13 November 1885 – 24 October 1984) was a Danish sports shooter. He competed in the 300 metre free rifle event at the 1908 Summer Olympics.

References

External links
 

1885 births
1984 deaths
Danish male sport shooters
Olympic shooters of Denmark
Shooters at the 1908 Summer Olympics
Sportspeople from the Capital Region of Denmark